Les Surfs were a Yé-yé-style pop group from Madagascar, that existed from 1963 until 1971.

Members 

Monique (Monikya), born May 8, 1945, died November 15, 1993
Nicole born July 21, 1946, died May 5, 2000
Coco  born June 19, 1939
Pat born April 13, 1941
Rocky born May 7, 1942
Dave born December 4, 1943

History 

Coco, Pat, Rocky, Dave, Monikya (Monique), and Nicole Rabaraona were the eldest six of twelve children. Born in Madagascar, the four brothers and two sisters performed as the vocal group "Les Surfs" from 1963 to 1971.

On October 14, 1958, they entered a singing competition held by Radio Tananarive under the name "Rabaraona Brothers and Sisters" performing two songs by The Platters, "Only You" and "The Great Pretender". They were awarded with first prize and then began performing under the new name "The Beryl". They toured Madagascar with Henry Ratsimbazafy and the CCC guitars, and it was at this time they recorded their first 45's, "Little Flower," "Marin," and "The Three Bells".

On September 8, 1963, they appeared during the grand opening of the second television station in France. Their performance endeared them to the French public, so Jean-Louis Rafidy, who was chaperone to the Rabaraonas while in Paris, urged them to sign a contract with Festival Records and release a single as soon as possible. With the release of "Reviens Vite Et Oublie" a cover of "Be My Baby", the group who were now named "Les Surfs" were at the top of the charts for three months in France and in Spain and Mexico with a Spanish version. They toured with Frank Alamo and Sheila and in 1964 they performed at the Olympia in Paris. It was here they were proclaimed the "Newcomers Of The Year".

They recorded and toured throughout the 1960s in languages and countries all over the world. Performances at San Remo secured them as a popular act in Italy, Spain, and Germany. With further television appearances in France, Italy, England, and the United States they garnered an international audience of millions. As a dynamic-sounding, original-looking group, they secured many original compositions and some covers of English-language songs.

During a career spanning from 1958 to 1971, they also performed for royalty. By the late 1960s they had their own young families and so in 1971, at the end of a very long tour, Les Surfs decided to break up.

The following years would see Monique and Rocky reunite for a couple of years but this didn't last. The boys settled in Canada and started their own families. Monique lived in Canada for a while but eventually returned to live in France. Nicole immigrated to the United States and worked as a carer for children in need. Monique died suddenly on November 15, 1993 at the age of 48. She is survived by her two sons Lawrence and Nicolas. Nicole died on May 5, 2000 and was laid to rest with her sister in the Rabaraona family tomb in Fiakarana, Madagascar.

In 2008, Dave Rabaraona started a new group "Les Surfs 2008" which participated in the French tour "Âge tendre et tête de bois 2008" during the 2008-2009 season. The line up of "Les Surfs 2008" included, in addition to Dave Rabaraona, Isa Rabaraona, Jackya Rabaraona, his cousin Bruno, and Mahenintsoa Fidy.

Filmography and TV 

 Tête de Bois et Tendres Années (1963) French TV
 Tête de Bois et Tendres Années (1964) French TV
 Cherchez l'idole (1964) French film
 La Rose d’or de Montreux, appearing with The Rolling Stones (1964) Swiss TV
 Ready Steady Go!, with Petula Clark (1964) London TV
 Petula Clark Show (1965) London TV
 Rundherum die welt (1965) Hamburg TV
 La Rose d’or de Montreux (1965) Swiss TV
 The Hollywood Palace (1965) American TV
 Ready Steady Go!, appearing with The Rolling Stones (1966) London TV
 This Is Tom Jones (1966) London TV
 Petula Clark Show (1966) London TV
 Cravate Noir (1967) French TV
 Les Palmarès des Chansons (1967) French TV
 The Talk Of The Town (1968) London TV
 The Jack Benny Show (1968) London TV

Discography 
 Go Your Way (Gentille, Lentine, Connor) 1965 (RCA 1461)

45 RPM EPs France
 Reviens vite et oublie / Ce garçon / Dum Dum Dee Dum / Pas si simple que ça (1963 - Festival FX 1363)
 Si j'avais un marteau / Écoute cet air-là / T'en va pas comme ça / Uh Uh (1963 - Festival FX 1367)
 À présent tu peux t'en aller / Je sais qu'un jour / Je te pardonne / Ça n'a pas d'importance from the film Cherchez L'Idole (1964 - Festival FX 1378)
 Shoop Shoop... Va l'embrasser / Je ne suis pas trop jeune / Adieu chagrin / Avec toi je ne sais plus (1964 - Festival FX 1380)
 Chaque nuit / Tu n'iras pas au ciel / Un toit ne suffit pas / Sacré Josh (1964 - Festival FX 1410)
 Le Printemps sur la colline / Tu Verras / Café, Vanille ou Chocolat / Pour une rose (1965 - Festival FX 1432)
 Tant que tu seras / Clac tape / Pour une pomme / Partager tous tes rêves (1965 - Festival FX 1442)
 Scandale dans la famille / Défense de toucher à mon amour / Ton souvenir / Stop (1965 - Festival FX 1459)
 Reviens Sloopy / Les hommes n'auront plus de peurs / If You Please / Pourquoi pas moi (1965 - Festival FX 1470)
 Par amour pour toi / Les Mouches au plafond / Va où tu veux / Sur tous les murs (1966 - Festival FX 1480)
 Alors / Mon chat qui s'appelle Médor / Longtemps / Pulchérie chérie (1966 - Festival FX 1496)
 Une rose de Vienne / Si loin d'Angleterre / Les Troubadours de notre temps / Un jour se lève (1966 - Festival FX 1513)
 Mon pays est bien loin / Drôle de fille / C'est grâce à toi / J'ai tant de joie (1967 - Festival FX 1533)
 Les Noces d'argent / Toi seul / Une tête dure / Aime-moi comme je t'aime (1967 - Festival FX 1562)

45 RPM EPs Spain

 Tu Serás Mi Baby / Mi Mejor Amigo / Dum-dum-dee-dum / Es Más Fácil Decirlo Que Hacerlo (Hispavox-Festival HF 37-52)
 Si Tuviera Un Martillo / Crossfire / Cuándo Lleguen Los Santos / No, No Me Dejes (Hispavox-Festival HF 37-53)
 Ciribiribín / Uh Huh / 100.000 Chicas / No Quieras A Un Extraño (Hispavox-Festival HF 37-55)
 Tu Serás Mi Baby / Ciribiribín / No, No Te Yayas / El Crossfire (Hispavox-Festival HF 37-57)
 Ahora Te Puedes Marchar / En Un Salón Del Siglo XVIII / No Tiene Importancia / Baby, Te Quiero (Hispavox-Festival HF 37-58)
 Su Forma De Besar / Nos Ven Muy Jóvenes / Hay Un Lugar / Hago Mal En Quererte (Hispavox-Festival HF 37-60)
 De Mi Mejor Amigo (Compilación con otros cantantes) (Hispavox-Festival HF 37-61)
 Cada Noche / Nunca Alcanzarás El Cielo / Querido Guillermo / Una Casa No Es Un Hogar (Hispavox-Festival HF 37-64)
 Su Forma De Besar / Ahora Te Puedes Marchar / Ya Verás / Por Una Rosa (Hispavox-Festival HF 37-66)
 Stop / La Gente Dice / Tus Sueños / Café, Vainilla O Chocolate (Hispavox-Festival HF 37-67)
 Por Una Rosa / Clac Tape / Ya Verás / El Juego Del Amor (Hispavox-Festival HF 37-69)
 Stop / El Juego Del Amor / El Mundo Necesita Amor / Escándalo En La Familia (Hispavox-Festival HF 37-71)
 Prohibido Acercarse A Mi Chica / ¿Por Qué No Yo? / Hang On, Sloopy / If You Please (Hispavox-Festival HF 37-72)
 En Una Flor / La Vida Es Así / Concierto Para Enamorados / Café, Vainilla O Chocolate (Hispavox-Festival HF 37-76)
 Flores En La Pared / Cosi' Come' Viene / In Un Fiore / En Las Paredes (Hispavox-Festival HF 37-79)

45 RPM EPs Italy

 Ce Garçon (My Best Friend) / Reviens Vite Et Oublie (Be My Baby) (Festival FX 110)
 Si J'avais Un Marteau (If I had a hammer) / Uh Huh (Festival FX 111)
 Quando Balli Il Surf / E Adesso Te Ne Puoi Andare (Festival FX 117)
 T'en Va Pas Comme Ça / Ça N'a Pas D'Importance (Festival FX 118)
 Quando Balli Il Surf / Spegnete Quella Luce (Festival FX 119)
 Si vedrà / Piu' Si Che No (Festival FX 125)
 Stop / Per Una Rosa (Festival FX 126)
 Clap Tap / Quando Tu Vorrai (Festival FX 130)
 Un Grosso Scandalo / Spiegami Come Mai (Festival FX 131)
 Così Come Viene / In Un Fiore (Festival FX 133)
 Molto Di Piu' / Va Dove Vuoi (Festival FX 135)
 L'Amore Verra' / AlloraLaLaLa (Festival FX 137)
 Quando Dico Che Ti Amo / L'Importante E Essere Liberi (Festival FX 140)

33 RPM LPs France

 Les Surfs à l'Olympia (1964 - Festival FLD 330 S) : Reviens vite et oublie / Ce garçon / Oublie cet étranger / Pas si simple que ça / Cent mille filles / Gotta Lotta Love / Si j'avais un marteau / Écoute cet air-là / T'en va pas comme ça / Dum Dum Dee Dum / Uh Uh / When the Saints Go Marching In
 Les Surfs (1964 - Festival FLD 337 S) : Chaque nuit / Sacré Josh / Tu n'iras pas au ciel / Tu pars et tu pleures / Ils disaient / Adieu marin / Un toit ne suffit pas / Moi, qui t'aime encore / Pour une rose / Reste avec moi / Je ne veux pas changer / Richard Cœur de Lion
 Les Surfs (1964 - Festival FLD 340 S) : Adieu, chagrin / It's All Right / Avec toi, je ne sais plus / Je te pardonne / Toi, tu m'as tout donné / Shoop Shoop... Va l'embrasser / À présent tu peux t'en aller / Je sais qu'un jour / Ça n'a pas d'importance / Je ne suis pas trop jeune
 Les Surfs (1965 - Festival FLD 345 S) : Si j'avais un marteau /  Reviens vite et oublie / Tu Verras / Claque Tape / Stop / Pour Une Rose / When the Saints Go Marching In / Café, Vanille ou Chocolat / Le Printemps sur la colline / Défense de toucher à mon amour / Partager tous tes rêves / Ne joue pas la comédie / À présent tu peux t'en aller
 Les Surfs (1966 - Festival FLD 375 S) : Alors / Les Mouches au plafond / Pulchérie chérie / Longtemps / Sur tous les murs / Reviens, Sloopy / Mon chat, qui s'appelle Médor / If You Please / Les hommes n'auront plus de peurs / Pourquoi pas moi / Va où tu veux / Par amour pour toi

33 RPM LPs Spain

 16 Grandes Éxitos De Les Surfs (1964 Hispavox-Festival HF 31-02) - Tu Serás Mi Baby / Su Forma De Besar / Ahora Te Puedes Marchar / El Crossfire / No, No Te Yayas / Dum-dum-dee-dum / Todo Me Lo Has Dado / Ciribiribín / Si Tuviera Un Martillo / Hay Un Lugar / De Mi Mejor Amigo / 100.000 Chicas / No Tiene Importancia / Apaguen Esa Luz / Es Más Fácil Decirlo Que Hacerlo / Cuándo Lleguen Los Santos
 Les Surfs 16 Grandes Exitos (1976 Hispavox-Festival HF 31-03) - Tu Serás Mi Baby / Su Forma De Besar / Ahora Te Puedes Marchar / El Crossfire / No, No Te Yayas / Dum-dum-dee-dum / Todo Me Lo Has Dado / Ciribiribín / Si Tuviera Un Martillo / Hay Un Lugar / De Mi Mejor Amigo / 100.000 Chicas / No Tiene Importancia / Apaguen Esa Luz / Es Más Fácil Decirlo Que Hacerlo / Cuándo Lleguen Los Santos

External links 
 Les Surfs Official Site
 Les Surfs History, Biography, Photos, Videos, Links to merchandise and much more

Malagasy musical groups
Musical groups established in 1963
Musical groups disestablished in 1971
Sibling musical groups